Chapel Hill Church Tabernacle is a historic Methodist church tabernacle located near Denton, Davidson County, North Carolina. It was built in 1870 and enlarged in the 1920s.  It is a one-story, heavy-timber, open-framework building, open on three sides.  It has a concrete floor and a gable-on-hip roof. The tabernacle was originally used for the religious services at the annual camp meetings. The tabernacle is located on the grounds of Chapel Hill United Methodist Church, whose congregation dates from 1854.

It was added to the National Register of Historic Places in 2012.

See also

Balls Creek Campground
Ocean Grove Camp Meeting Association
Center Arbor
Pleasant Grove Camp Meeting Ground

References

External links
Chapel Hill United Methodist Church 

Churches on the National Register of Historic Places in North Carolina
Methodist churches in North Carolina
Churches completed in 1870
19th-century Methodist church buildings in the United States
Buildings and structures in Davidson County, North Carolina
National Register of Historic Places in Davidson County, North Carolina
Tabernacles (Methodist)